Tut-e Safar (also Romanized as Tūt-e Şafar) is a village in Jannatabad Rural District, Salehabad County, Razavi Khorasan Province, Iran. At the 2006 census, its population was 168, in 36 families.

References 

Populated places in   Torbat-e Jam County